The Iconfactory is a software and graphic design company that designs commercial icons and user interfaces and publishes desktop applications and mobile apps for macOS and iOS.

History
The Iconfactory was founded in April 1996 by Corey Marion, Talos Tsui, and Gedeon Maheux. Lead Engineer Craig Hockenberry joined the company in 1997 and Artist Dave Brasgalla joined in January 1999. The company incorporated in January 2000. The Iconfactory gained popularity through the creation of packages of free icons for download.

From 1997 until 2004, The Iconfactory held an annual icon design contest for the Macintosh icon community called Pixelpalooza. The competition was a chance for artists to design and produce original icon creations for the chance of winning software and hardware prizes. Pixelpalooza was discontinued in 2005 and is now "on hiatus for an indefinite time."

Iconfactory created over 100 icons for Microsoft to be included in the Windows XP operating system. They also created the base icons in Windows Vista's Aero interface.

In 2004, Iconfactory created over 100 icons for the Xbox 360 user interface and website.

Alleged patent infringement
On  May 31, 2011, patent company Lodsys asserted two of its four patents: U.S. Patent No. 7,620,565 ("the '565 patent") on a "customer-based design module" and U.S. Patent No. 7,222,078 ("the '078 patent") on "Methods and Systems for Gathering Information from Units of a Commodity Across a Network." against Iconfactory and 6 other developers for using Apple's API for in-app purchases.

See also
 Computer Icons
 Wikipedia:Icons
 IconBuilder
 Icon Composer

References

External links

 
Companies established in 1996
Companies based in Greensboro, North Carolina
Icon software
Macintosh software companies
Apple Design Awards recipients
Software companies of the United States